The 1970 Balochistan Provincial Assembly election was held on 17 December 1970. 21 members were elected. The assembly convened for its inaugural session on 2 May 1972; Ataullah Mengal was elected as the Chief Minister while Ghous Bakhsh Raisani became the Leader of Opposition.

Results

References 

Elections in Balochistan
1970 elections in Pakistan